The 2016 Slovenian Football Cup was the final match of the 2015–16 Slovenian Football Cup to decide the winner of the 25th edition of the Slovenian Football Cup, Slovenia's top knockout tournament. It was played on 25 May 2016 at Bonifika Stadium in Koper and was won by Maribor, who defeated Celje 7–6 after the penalty shootout. This was the ninth cup title for Maribor.

Background
The final was played between Celje and Maribor, both competing in the Slovenian PrvaLiga. This was the third time that Maribor and Celje met in the cup final, having faced each other in the final during the 2011–12 and 2012–13 cup edition with Maribor winning both editions. Celje previously competed in eight finals, but won only once, when they defeated Gorica in the 2004–05 cup edition.

Road to the final

Note: In all results below, the score of the finalist is given first.

Match details

See also
2015–16 Slovenian Cup
2015–16 Slovenian PrvaLiga

References

Cup
Slovenian Football Cup finals
Slovenian Football Cup Final 2016
Slovenian Football Cup Final 2016
Slovenian Football Cup Final 2016